Caulanthus is a genus of plants in the family Brassicaceae. Plants of this genus may be known as jewelflowers. They are also often referred to as wild cabbage, although this common name usually refers to wild variants of Brassica oleraceae, the cabbage plant. Jewelflowers are native to the southwestern United States and northern Mexico, where they are often found in warm, arid regions. Many species have an enlarged, erect stem rising from a basal rosette of leaves. Flowers arise directly from the surface of the stem; many species have colorful, bell-shaped flowers. The best-known of the fourteen species is probably the desert candle.

Selected species:
Caulanthus amplexicaulis - claspingleaf wild cabbage, Santa Barbara jewelflower
Caulanthus anceps - Lemmon's mustard
Caulanthus barnebyi - Black Rock wild cabbage
Caulanthus californicus - California jewelflower
Caulanthus cooperi - Cooper's wild cabbage
Caulanthus coulteri - Coulter's wild cabbage
Caulanthus crassicaulis - thickstem wild cabbage
Caulanthus glaucus - glaucous wild cabbage
Caulanthus hallii - Hall's wild cabbage
Caulanthus heterophyllus - San Diego wild cabbage
Caulanthus inflatus - desert candle
Caulanthus major - slender wild cabbage
Caulanthus pilosus - hairy wild cabbage, chocolate drops
Caulanthus simulans - Payson's wild cabbage

Formerly included taxa
Guillenia flavescens - yellow mustard
Guillenia lasiophylla - California mustard
Guillenia lemmonii - Lemmon's mustard

External links
Jepson Manual Treatment
USDA Plants Profile

 
Brassicaceae genera